Phir Hera Pheri is a 2006 Indian Hindi-language comedy film written and directed by Neeraj Vora. It serves as the sequel to Hera Pheri (2000) and second installment of the Hera Pheri franchise. It stars Akshay Kumar, Suniel Shetty and Paresh Rawal reprising their roles from the previous film with Bipasha Basu, Rimi Sen, Johnny Lever and Rajpal Yadav. The plot follows, a twist of fate changes the lives of Raju, Shyam and Baburao when they get cheated by a fraudster Anuradha. They must now find another way to repay the loan taken from a dreaded gangster Totla Seth. The central plot takes inspiration from the 1998 film Lock, Stock and Two Smoking Barrels and  The Circus.

Upon its release on 9 June 2006, the film was a major commercial success, becoming the 8th highest grosser of the year.

Over the years, the film has attained a cult status and significant fan following across generations owing to Akshay Kumar's comic timing as well its supporting casts like Rawal, Lever and Yadav. It is now considered a milestone in comedy films, as well as one of the best sequels ever made.

Plot
Hera Pheri ended with the trio of Raju, Ghanshyam alias Shyam, and Baburao Ganpatrao Apte (fondly called as Babu Bhaiya); rich and rolling in money. Phir Hera Pheri tells the story of what happens after they become wealthy.

The film opens with a prologue bringing the audience up to raisin, stating that each has suffered a personal loss despite their new riches. Shyam lost his only love Anuradha Shivshanker Panikar in an accident, Raju lost his ailing mother, and Babu Bhaiya - having nothing to lose in the first place - lost the little traces of common sense that he did possess.

The three men are living a lavish life in a massive mansion and splurging on various luxuries. Raju hears about an idea for doubling his wealth in 21 days from a con woman, Anuradha, who is claiming to be a bank manager, and she convinces Shyam and Babu Bhaiya to go along with it. Raju first arranges for ₹30 lakh from Shyam and Babu Bhaiya and then a further ₹50 lakh by selling their bungalow. He convinces a small-time goon, Pappu, to contribute the remaining balance of ₹20 lakh so that he can come up with the minimum deposit of ₹1 crore, which Anuradha has promised to double.

The trio invests the money and three weeks later realizes that it was all a scam and that they are now penniless. To make matters worse, they do not even have possession of their bungalow, which Raju had sold off to arrange the last bit of money needed, and have to live in a chawl (tenement). Pappu shows up at the bungalow the next day to pick up his portion of the money but is shocked to learn that Raju has left and the bungalow is now in possession of a Parsi gun collector. Pappu is now in trouble because he had borrowed money from a lisping but dreaded gangster, Tiwari, who will kill him if he doesn't pay up.

He comes across Raju one day, and upon hearing of the scam pretends to be sympathetic. He tricks him and brings the three to his boss, telling him that they are the ones who took the money. Tiwari threatens them and tells them they have to come up with the money or else they will die. As they are being taken home by some of Tiwari's goons, the three manage to escape. Raju, Shyam, and Babu Bhaiya are about to leave the city when Raju remembers that he owes money to a woman named Anjali Patekar. The three head over to her house and are surprised to find that she is Pappu's sister. Tiwari's goons show up and kidnap Anjali because Pappu has not returned the money. Feeling guilty that he is the one who got Anjali in trouble, Raju decides that he will go to Tiwari and try to get her freed. Shyam and Babu Bhaiya refuse to leave without them and decide to stay as well. The three go back to Tiwari to ask him to release Anjali, and Tiwari tells them to bring the money, releasing Anjali.

Raju, Shyam, and Babu Bhaiya now have three days to come up with ₹40 lakh to pay back the goon, or else they will themselves be killed. Raju overhears the neighbor, Munna Bhai, plotting to steal drugs from another gangster, Nanji Bhai, and wrongly assumes they are talking about stealing money. Raju hatches a plan for the three of them to steal from Munna Bhai. The three manage to succeed barely but are confused when they do not find money inside. Raju recognizes stuff like drugs and tells them that they are worth at least ₹3 crores (thirty million). They think that if they can sell them to Kachra Seth and pay off Tiwari, they can also become rich, but their neighbor once again steals the drugs from them. They then run into Anuradha, and she tells them that the entire scam was hatched by Kabira (the gangster from the first Hera Pheri) and his close aide Chhota Chetan to get revenge on the trio and that the only reason she went along with it was that they were holding her niece hostage (Anuradha's sister was Kabira's gang member and part of the first film's kidnapping plot). Their money was converted to diamonds to pay the ransom, but she fled with them once she discovered her niece had escaped and hid them under a decoration of a circus train (named "Kook-Doo-Koo").

In the end, all the guys end up in a circus show where they attempt to get hold of the drugs and the diamonds. These are strewn all over the ground in public by a gorilla. Soon the cops reach the spot, and they arrest Tiwari, Nanji Bhai as well as Chhota Chetan. Raju, Shyam, and Babu Bhaiya flee along with Anjali, Anuradha, and her niece. Raju escapes with Pappu's cellphone and three antique guns with him, which are worth ₹5–6 crore, though he does not know about it. Pappu informs Shyam and Babu Bhaiya about the guns, after which they try to call Raju on his cellphone. The film ends in a cliffhanger where Raju is about to throw the weapons in the river with his cellphone ringing in his mouth.

Cast
Akshay Kumar as Rajesh Rathod ″Raju″
Suniel Shetty as Ghanshyam Tripathi ″Shyam″ 
Paresh Rawal as Baburao Ganpatrao Apte (Babu Bhaiya)
Bipasha Basu as Anuradha
Rimi Sen as Anjali Patekar, Pappu's sister
Johnny Lever as Goon Munna / Dhotar Chor
Sharat Saxena as Gangster Tiwari / Totla Seth, Pappu's boss
Manoj Joshi as Kachra Seth
Milind Gunaji as Nanji Bhai
Rajpal Yadav as Pappu Patekar, Anjali's brother
Ravi Kishan as Gangster Chhote, Tiwari's sidekick
Suresh Menon as Peter Singh, Nanji's most trusted sidekick & Munna's secret informer
Dinesh Hingoo as Parsi Gun Collector
Tiku Talsania as Police Officer (special appearance)
Javed Khan Amrohi as Khetwadi Police Chowki Constable
Razak Khan as Chhota Chetan, Kabeera's sidekick
Gulshan Grover as Gangster Kabeera (archive footage)
Kashmira Shah as Kabeera's Gang Member and Anuradha's sister (archive footage)
Sunil Pal as Kishan Verma, Munna's sidekick
Kiku Sharda as Kanji Singh, Munna's sidekick
Viju Khote as Ravana from Ram-Leela, troupe member
Madan Singh as Tiwari's tall henchman (voice dubbed by Shailendra Pandey)
Manmouji as Ram-Leela Troupe Member
Jagdeep Singh as Headless Giant
Mukesh Ahuja as Circus Magician
Nana Patekar as Narrator
Diya Mirza as an Item Girl in the song "Pyaar Ki Chatni" (special appearance)
Neeraj Vora as the Bus Passenger speaking on the Phone (special appearance)
Ghanshyam Rohera as Bus Conductor (special appearance)

Soundtrack
The music was composed by Himesh Reshammiya, with lyrics written by Sameer. The soundtrack album was released by T-Series.

The song "Aye Meri Zohrajabeen" was only seen in the end title credits. The song became so popular that it was added in the movie later. The dream sequence of Rawal was added following the song.

According to the Indian trade website Box Office India, with around 10,00,000 units sold, this film's soundtrack album was the year's fifteenth highest-selling.

Track listing

Awards

Box Office
Film received positive reviews from critics and earned 70 Crore INR at the end of its theatrical run & it was a box-office blockbuster.

Sequel
A sequel titled Hera Pheri 3 is planned, but the production was postponed after director Neeraj Vora died on 14 December 2017 after a prolonged illness. After the response from Firoz Nadiadwala, the sequel is under production and will be released soon.

On 23 May 2018, it was confirmed that Hera Pheri 3 will now be directed by Indra Kumar and star the same team of Akshay Kumar, Sunil Shetty, and Paresh Rawal in the lead. It was reported that the film will be shot on a start-to-finish schedule and Kumar confirmed to The Indian Express that the film will be ready for release in the second half of 2019 (but it didn't release in 2019). The film will continue the story of the previous two. Later, Indra Kumar left the project for unknown reasons and confirmed that Priyadarshan, who directed the first movie, will return as the director of the third.

On 21 February 2023, Sudden news of  much awaited Hera Pheri 3 came into light directed by Farhad Samji , Later a picture gone viral which is said to be from promo set. Hera Pheri 3 is starring the legendary trio of Akshay Kumar as Raju,Sunil Shetty as Shyam and Paresh Rawal as Baburao.

References

External links
 

2006 films
2000s Hindi-language films
Indian sequel films
Indian buddy comedy films
Indian films about cannabis
2000s buddy comedy films
Films about the illegal drug trade
Films scored by Himesh Reshammiya
Films directed by Neeraj Vora
2006 comedy films
Circus films
Indian crime comedy films